The Infiniti QX50, previously the Infiniti EX or Nissan Skyline Crossover until 2013, is a compact luxury crossover SUV produced by Infiniti, the luxury vehicle division of Japanese automaker Nissan. The first-generation QX50 is a minor model update of the EX, while also changing the nameplate to QX50 in line with the marque's new Q and QX nomenclature, which took place for the 2013 (China) and 2015 (United States) model years. The second-generation QX50 entered production in November 2017 as a 2019 model.



First generation (J50; 2007)

Infiniti EX

Infiniti EX Concept (2007) 
The concept car was unveiled during the 2007 New York Auto Show. It included a surround-view camera (marketed as Around View Monitor), lane departure system, V6 engine, 5-speed automatic transmission, all-wheel-drive, double-arch grille, large L-shaped headlights with adaptive front lighting system (AFS), integrated fog lights, LED taillights and an "arch" profile design.

EX35 (2007-2013) 
The production model EX35 was revealed at the 2007 Pebble Beach Concours d'Elegance, followed by Jamsil Olympic Stadium in Seoul.

North American model of the EX35 went on sale in December 2007 as a 2008 model year vehicle. The EX35 was offered with a  3.5 L V6 (VQ35HR) until it was rebadged in 2013 as EX37 with a  3.7 L V6 (VQ37VHR). For the 2014 model year, Infiniti again rebadged all of its models renaming the EX37 as QX50.

South Korean model went on sale in 2008-01-24 as 2008 model year vehicle.

EX37 
European market

The Infiniti EX is sold as the EX37 in the European market. It debuted in Fall 2008. Japanese versions are badged as the Nissan Skyline Crossover.

EX30d 
A new 3.0-liter V6 (V9X) diesel engine became available on the 2010 EX, FX and M models. The engine comes with a seven-speed automatic transmission.

The brand entered the European market with a new 3.0-liter V6 diesel. The engine was the first Diesel in the Infiniti brand's 20-year history.

European model went on sale as 2010 model year vehicle.

EX25 
The engine is mated to a seven-speed automatic transmission. It was launched at the 2010 Beijing International Automotive Exhibition. The EX25 Crossover is currently marketed only in China, Malaysia, Russia and Ukraine.

Engines

Transmissions

Transmissions include manual shift mode that includes the option of sequentially selected manual gearshifts and Downshift Rev Matching (DRM). U.S. models include a choice of RWD or ATTESA E-TS AWD. Models sold in Canada, Europe include ATTESA E-TS AWD as standard.

The Infiniti EX35 line has a 0- time of 5.8 - 6.2 seconds. Roadholding is .83g.

Features 
The Infiniti EX was the first production automobile to offer a surround-view camera, marketed as Around View Monitor. The cameras are located at the front, back and sides of the vehicle and feed images to an image processing unit; those individual inputs are analyzed, synthesized to offer a synthetic but positionally accurate top-down view of the car and its surroundings. The image appears in lifelike detail. 

 The EX is also one of the first production automobiles to feature "Scratch Shield," a "self-healing clearcoat paint. The paint self-repairs fine scratches, such as fingernail scratches under door handles, restoring the EX's surface close to the original state. The process, which takes anywhere from one day to one week (depending on the surrounding temperature and the depth of the scratch), is accomplished through the use of an elastic resin. It is combined with a conventional clearcoat to increase the paint's flexibility and strength by raising the resin density."
 The EX becomes the second Infiniti production vehicle, following the 2008 Infiniti M series, to offer the Lane Departure Prevention (LDP) system. This utilizes the electronic stability control system to help assist the driver in maintaining lane position by applying gentle brake pressure on each wheel individually to generate intended movement. It sounds an alert and nudges the vehicle in the correct direction when lane departure is detected. It also applies braking actuation to bring vehicle back in the lane.

Infiniti QX50

QX50 (2013)

The vehicle was unveiled in the 2013 Nanjing Auto Show.

Middle East models went on sale as 2014 model year vehicle. Early models include VQ37VHR 3.7-liter V6 (326PS) engine with all wheel drive, 7-speed automatic transmission with manual shift mode, DS mode with Downshift Rev Matching (DRM), and Adaptive Shift Control.

US models went on sale as 2014 model year vehicles. Early models included QX50, QX50 AWD, QX50 Journey and QX50 AWD Journey.

QX50L (2015)
The China model was set to go on sale in 2015.

Engines

Transmissions

Production
Production of the Chinese models of QX50L at Xiangyang plant in Hubei Province was set to begin in 2014.

Marketing
Infiniti QX50L was used as the actors' official passenger vehicle for the Where Are We Going? Dad (爸爸去哪儿) television series.

2015 update

QX50 (2015)

The vehicle was unveiled in the 2014 Guangzhou motor show, followed by the 2015 New York Auto Show.

Delivery of China model began in February 2015.

US models went on sale as 2016 model year vehicle. Early models included 3.7, 3.7 AWD.

Engines

Transmissions

Second generation (J55; 2019)

The production version of the second-generation QX50 was unveiled at the 2017 LA Auto Show as a 2019 model. It features a turbocharged 2.0 L KR20DDET gasoline engine equipped with Nissan's VC-T variable compression ratio system.

Production of the QX50 began in November 2017 at COMPAS, a Nissan and Daimler AG's joint plant in Aguascalientes, Mexico.

QX55
Introduced in the first quarter of 2021 for the 2022 model year, the QX55 is a "coupé SUV" version of the QX50 with a more sloped roof design. Infiniti intends it to be the spiritual successor to the FX.

QX Sport Inspiration Concept (2016)
It included 21-inch wheels, black and white interior upholstery.

The vehicle was unveiled in the 2016 Beijing Motor Show, followed by the 2016 Paris Motor Show (with gray body color, 22-inch wheels in bronze, brown leather interior upholstery, 2.0-liter inline-four variable compression engine with compression ratio between 8:1 and 14:1), 2016 Los Angeles Auto Show (with black and white interior upholstery).

QX50 Concept (2017)
It included a 2.0-liter inline-four variable compression engine with compression ratio between 8:1 and 14:1, front-drive platform.

The vehicle was unveiled in the 2017 North American International Auto Show.

The 2023 QX50 features a new sport trim level with blacked out exterior and interior styling and two new interior colors, Monaco Red (Sport only) and Pebble Gray (Luxe, Sensory, and Autograph only). Optional on QX50 Luxe and standard on QX50 Sport is a 12-speaker bose premium audio system.

Safety

QX50
The 2020 QX50 was tested by the Insurance Institute for Highway Safety.

QX55
The 2022 QX55 was tested by the Insurance Institute for Highway Safety.

Sales

References

External links
Infiniti QX Sport Inspiration: English
Infiniti QX50: global, UK
Press kit:
USA: 2014 USA, 2015 USA, 2016 USA

QX50
Cars introduced in 2013
2020s cars
Compact sport utility vehicles
Luxury crossover sport utility vehicles
Rear-wheel-drive vehicles
Front-wheel-drive vehicles
All-wheel-drive vehicles
Vehicles with CVT transmission